Attorney General Hogan may refer to:

Michael Joseph Hogan (1908–1986), Attorney General of Malaya
Timothy Sylvester Hogan (politician) (1864–1926), Attorney General of Ohio

See also
General Hogan (disambiguation)